Anna Minguzzi (born circa 1973) is an Italian condensed matter physicist who works in France as a director of research for the French National Centre for Scientific Research, affiliated with the Laboratoire de Physique et Modélisation des Milieux Condensés (LPMMC) in Grenoble. Her research involves quantum fluids, gases of ultracold atoms, fermionic condensates, Bose–Einstein condensates, exciton-polaritons, and atomtronics.

Education
Minguzzi studied physics at the Scuola Normale Superiore di Pisa, where she earned her Ph.D. in 1999. There, she directed the Laboratoire de Physique et Modélisation des Milieux Condensés from 2014 to 2020, headed the condensed matter division of the Société Française de Physique, led the Quantum Grenoble project, and founded the QuantAlps Research Federation, quantum computing collaborations centered at Grenoble Alpes University.

Recognition
She received the CNRS Silver Medal in 2023.

References

External links

Year of birth missing (living people)
Living people
Italian physicists
Italian women physicists
Condensed matter physicists
Scuola Normale Superiore di Pisa alumni
Research directors of the French National Centre for Scientific Research